= National Weather Service Duluth, Minnesota =

Weather forecast office of the National Weather Service

National Weather Service Duluth is a weather forecast office responsible for monitoring weather conditions for 18 counties in the states of Minnesota and Wisconsin. The office is in charge of weather forecasts, warnings and local statements as well as aviation weather. It is also equipped with a WSR-88D (NEXRAD) radar, and an Automated Surface Observing System (ASOS) that greatly increase the ability to forecast.

== NOAA Weather Radio ==

National Weather Service Duluth Forecast Office in Duluth, Minnesota provides programming for 15 NOAA Weather Radio stations across North Central and Northeast Minnesota and Northwest Wisconsin.

=== KIG64 Twin Ports/Duluth ===
KIG64
Duluth, Minnesota
- Frequency: 162.550 MHz

Programming
- Language: English
- Format: Weather/Civil Emergency

Technical information
- Power: 1000 Watts

Links
- Website: KIG64

KIG64 broadcasts weather and hazard information for Carlton, Lake, Pine, Southwestern St. Louis & Southeastern St. Louis counties in Minnesota. And Bayfield & Douglas counties in Wisconsin.

=== KZZ84 Aitkin ===
KZZ84
Aitkin, Minnesota
- Frequency: 162.450 MHz

Programming
- Language: English
- Format: Weather/Civil Emergency

Technical information
- Power: 1000 Watts

Links
- Website: KZZ84

KZZ84 broadcasts weather and hazard information for Aitkin, Carlton, Crow Wing, Kanabec, Mille Lacs, Morrison & Pine counties in Minnesota.

=== WNG678 Pine City ===
WNG678
Pine City, Minnesota
- Frequency: 162.425 MHz

Programming
- Language: English
- Format: Weather/Civil Emergency

Technical information
- Power: 1000 Watts

Links
- Website: WNG678

WNG678 broadcasts weather and hazard information for Aitkin, Anoka, Chisago, Isanti, Kanabec, Mille Lacs & Pine counties in Minnesota. And Burnett & Polk counties in Wisconsin.

=== KZZ45 Virginia ===
KZZ45
Virginia, Minnesota
- Frequency: 162.475 MHz

Programming
- Language: English
- Format: Weather/Civil Emergency

Technical information
- Power: 300 Watts

Links
- Website: KZZ45

KZZ45 broadcasts weather and hazard information for Western St. Louis & Eastern St. Louis counties in Minnesota.

=== KZZ29 Coleraine ===
KZZ29
Grand Rapids, Minnesota
- Frequency: 162.400 MHz

Programming
- Language: English
- Format: Weather/Civil Emergency

Technical information
- Power: 1000 Watts

Links
- Webcast: Listen Live
- Website: KZZ29

KZZ29 broadcasts weather and hazard information for Northern Aitkin, Northern Cass, Itasca & Western St. Louis counties in Minnesota.

=== WNG630 Finland ===
WNG630
Finland, Minnesota
- Frequency: 162.425 MHz

Programming
- Language: English
- Format: Weather/Civil Emergency

Technical information
- Power: 300 Watts

Links
- Website: WNG630

WNG630 broadcasts weather and hazard information for Lake County in Minnesota.

=== WXJ64 Leader/Brainerd Lakes ===
WXJ64
Omen Lake, Minnesota
- Frequency: 162.550 MHz

Programming
- Language: English
- Format: Weather/Civil Emergency

Technical information
- Power: 1000 Watts

Links
- Webcast: Listen Live
- Website: WXJ64

WXJ64 broadcasts weather and hazard information for Cass, Crow Wing, Morrison, Otter Tail, Todd & Wadena counties in Minnesota.

=== WXK45 International Falls ===
WXK45
International Falls, Minnesota
- Frequency: 162.550 MHz

Programming
- Language: English
- Format: Weather/Civil Emergency

Technical information
- Power: 1000 Watts

Links
- Website: WXK45

WXK45 broadcasts weather and hazard information for Koochiching County in Minnesota.

=== KZZ44 Elephant Lake ===
KZZ44
Orr, Minnesota
- Frequency: 162.450 MHz

Programming
- Language: English
- Format: Weather/Civil Emergency

Technical information
- Power: 300 Watts

Links
- Website: KZZ44

KZZ44 broadcasts weather and hazard information for Koochiching & Northwestern St. Louis counties in Minnesota.

=== KXI43 Grand Marais ===
KXI43
Bogus Lake, Minnesota
- Frequency: 162.450 MHz

Programming
- Language: English
- Format: Weather/Civil Emergency

Technical information
- Power: 300 Watts

Links
- Website: KXI43

KXI43 broadcasts weather and hazard information for Cook County in Minnesota.

=== KXI44 Ely ===
KXI44
Ely, Minnesota
- Frequency: 162.500 MHz

Programming
- Language: English
- Format: Weather/Civil Emergency

Technical information
- Power: 300 Watts

Links
- Website: KXI44

KXI44 broadcasts weather and hazard information for Lake & Northeastern St. Louis counties in Minnesota.

=== KXI45 Gunflint Lake ===
KXI45
Gunflint Lake, Minnesota
- Frequency: 162.525 MHz

Programming
- Language: English
- Format: Weather/Civil Emergency

Technical information
- Power: 300 Watts

Links
- Website: KXI45

KXI45 broadcasts weather and hazard information for Cook & Lake counties in Minnesota.

=== KZZ79 Spooner ===
KZZ79
Lampson, Wisconsin
- Frequency: 162.475 MHz

Programming
- Language: English
- Format: Weather/Civil Emergency

Technical information
- Power: 1000 Watts

Links
- Website: KZZ79

KZZ79 broadcasts weather and hazard information for Pine County in Minnesota. And Barron, Bayfield, Burnett, Douglas, Polk, Sawyer & Washburn counties in Wisconsin.

=== KZZ78 Ashland ===
KZZ78
Ashland, Wisconsin
- Frequency: 162.525 MHz

Programming
- Language: English
- Format: Weather/Civil Emergency

Technical information
- Power: 1000 Watts

Links
- Website: KZZ78

KZZ78 broadcasts weather and hazard information for Gogebic County in Michigan. And Ashland, Bayfield & Iron counties in Wisconsin.

=== WXM91 Park Falls ===
WXM91
Park Falls, Wisconsin
- Frequency: 162.500 MHz

Programming
- Language: English
- Format: Weather/Civil Emergency

Technical information
- Power: 1000 Watts

Links
- Website: WXM91

WXM91 broadcasts weather and hazard information for Ashland, Iron, Oneida, Price, Sawyer & Vilas counties in Wisconsin.
